The Oakville Yacht Squadron (OYS) is a private yacht club based in Oakville, Ontario. Both past and present members have contributed to the sport of yachting and yacht design.

The Oakville Yacht Squadron has historically been renowned for its thriving junior program.

History
Founded in 1946, the Oakville Yacht Squadron is located on the shores of the Sixteen Mile Creek. In 1995 OYS absorbed former Oakville Harbour Yacht Club and a growing interest in cruising was augmented by the members integrated into the club at that time.

Racing
Oakville Yacht Squadron organized the Snipe Western Hemisphere & Orient Championship in 1964 and the Snipe North American Championship in 1973, 1983, 1997 and 2005.

OYS hosted the Lake Ontario 300 in 2006. Touted as the Greatest Yacht Race on the Lake, the LO300 had a field of over 110 boats.

In 2019, OYS hosts the 134th year Lake Ontario Yacht Racing (LYRA) Regatta.

References

External links

Oakville Yacht Squadron

Yacht clubs in Canada
1946 establishments in Ontario
Organizations based in Ontario
Oakville, Ontario